Solon Wesley Pierce (March 7, 1831September 23, 1903) was an American lawyer, newspaper publisher, and Republican politician.  He served seven terms in the Wisconsin State Assembly between 1870 and 1897, representing Adams County.  He also operated one of the first newspapers in Adams County, the Adams County Press.

Biography

Pierce was born in Yorkshire in Cattaraugus County, New York, in 1831.  He studied at the Mendon Academy in Monroe County, New York, and settled in Adams County, Wisconsin, in 1854.  He was admitted to the bar in 1858 and started a law practice in the county seat—Friendship.  He was first elected district attorney of Adams County in 1861, and the same year (with several associates) founded the Adams County Press, just a few weeks after the outbreak of the American Civil War. Pierce remained as editor and publisher of this newspaper (one of the first published in Adams County) for the majority of the next 40 years until his death in 1903.

In 1864 Pierce enlisted in the Union army, was commissioned a first lieutenant, and saw action (with the regiments that made up the 9th Army Corps, Army of the Potomac) at the Siege of Petersburg, among other battles toward the end of the Civil War.  These experiences formed the basis of his 1866 book Battle Fields and Camp Fires of the 38th Regiment, published by the Daily Wisconsin Printing House of Milwaukee.

After his honorable discharge in 1865, Pierce resumed his law practice and newspaper duties, serving several years as county judge, and beginning in 1870 was elected as a legislator to the Wisconsin Assembly, being re-elected to the same body in 1877, 1878, 1880, 1881, 1882, and 1897. He served as chairman of the Assembly's judiciary committee in 1880, 1881, and 1882.  As Adams County district attorney in 1892, he instituted the first successful gerrymander suit in the state of Wisconsin.  He is also credited with being the author of an 1882 amendment to the Wisconsin state constitution which provided for biennial elections of legislators.

Pierce died at his home in Friendship.

Published works

References

Further reading
Memorial and Biographical Record and Illustrated Compendium of Biography of Citizens of Columbia, Sauk and Adams Counties, Wisconsin. 1901. Chicago: G. A. Ogle & Co., pp. 224–226. 
Goc, Michael. 1999. From Past to Present: The History of Adams County. Friendship, Wisconsin: New Past Press.

External links 
 

 Solon Wesley Pierce obituary

1831 births
1903 deaths
Republican Party members of the Wisconsin State Assembly
People from Friendship, Wisconsin
People from Cattaraugus County, New York
People of Wisconsin in the American Civil War
Editors of Wisconsin newspapers
Writers from New York (state)
Writers from Wisconsin
Union Army officers
Journalists from New York (state)
19th-century American politicians